The men's ski cross competition of the FIS Freestyle Ski and Snowboarding World Championships 2015 was held at Kreischberg, Austria on January 24 (qualifying)  and January 25 (finals). 
52 athletes from 19 countries competed.

Results

Qualification
The following are the results of the qualification.

Elimination round

1/8 round
The top 32 qualifiers advanced to the 1/8 round. From here, they participated in four-person elimination races, with the top two from each race advancing. 

Heat 1

Heat 3

Heat 5

Heat 7

Heat 2

Heat 4

Heat 6

Heat 8

Quarterfinals round

Heat 1

Heat 3

Heat 2

Heat 4

Semifinals round

Heat 1

Heat 2

Final round

Small final

Final

References

ski cross, men's